The Art League of Daytona Beach is located at 433 South Palmetto Avenue, Daytona Beach, Florida. It contains exhibits by local artists, and holds regular classes and workshops.

Footnotes

Gallery

External links
 

Art museums and galleries in Florida
Arts centers in Florida
Buildings and structures in Daytona Beach, Florida
Tourist attractions in Daytona Beach, Florida
Education in Volusia County, Florida
Art galleries established in 1929
1929 establishments in Florida